Lacrima is a rare red wine grape that is native to the Marche region of Italy.  It is almost entirely found in the Italian DOC Lacrima di Morro d'Alba.  The grape's name (meaning "tear" in Italian) is derived from its tear-like shape, or, alternatively, its thin skin that allows tear-like drops of juice to drip from the grape. Lacrima is low in tannins and is considered usually best for drinking young.

References 

Red wine grape varieties
Wine grapes of Italy